Uručča (sometimes transliterated Uruchcha) is a Belarusan toponym, and may refer to:

 Uručča, a microdistrict in Minsk
 Uručča (Minsk Metro), a station serving it
 Uručča (village), near Bryansk